Humboldt may refer to:

People 
 Alexander von Humboldt, German natural scientist, brother of Wilhelm von Humboldt
 Wilhelm von Humboldt, German linguist, philosopher, and diplomat, brother of Alexander von Humboldt

Fictional characters 
 Humboldt Fleisher, character in novel Humboldt's Gift
 Wes Humboldt, character played by Mike O’Brien on Corner Gas

Places

Australia

 Humboldt, Queensland, a locality in the Central Highlands Region

Canada

 Humboldt, Saskatchewan
 Rural Municipality of Humboldt No. 370, Saskatchewan
 Humboldt (electoral district), a former federal electoral district
 Humboldt (provincial electoral district), a former Saskatchewan provincial electoral district

United States
 Settled places:
 Dewey-Humboldt, Arizona
 Humboldt, Illinois
 Humboldt, Iowa
 Humboldt, Kansas
 Humboldt, Minnesota
 Humboldt, Nebraska
 Humboldt, Ohio
 Humboldt, Portland, Oregon
 Humboldt, Pennsylvania
 Humboldt, South Dakota
 Humboldt, Tennessee
 In Wisconsin:
 Humboldt, Wisconsin,  town
 Humboldt (community), Wisconsin,  unincorporated community
 Superordinate governmental units:
 Counties:
 Humboldt County, California
 Humboldt County, Iowa
 Humboldt County, Nevada
 Humboldt Township (disambiguation)
 Humboldt-Toiyabe National Forest, Nevada
 Humboldt City, Nevada, ruins of mining settlement
 Humboldt Park, Chicago, a Chicago community area

Transportation
Humboldt station (Saskatchewan), a former railway station in Humboldt, Saskatchewan, Canada
Humboldt–Hospital station, a Buffalo Metro Rail station in Buffalo, New York, United States
Humboldt Street (LIRR station), a Long Island Rail Road station in Brooklyn, New York, United States

Other 
 Guevea de Humboldt, Oaxaca, Mexico

Geographical features

Mountains 
 In United States:
 Humboldt Peak (Colorado)
 Nevada:
 East Humboldt Range
 Humboldt Peak (Nevada)
 Humboldt Range
 West Humboldt Range
 Humboldt Mountains (Antarctica), Queen Maud Land
 Humboldt Mountains (New Zealand), Otago

 Pico Humboldt in Venezuela

Parks, forests, nature preserves 
 United States:
 California:
 Fort Humboldt State Historic Park, in Eureka
 Humboldt Bay National Wildlife Refuge 
 Humboldt Redwoods State Park
 Nevada:
 Humboldt Wildlife Management Area
 Humboldt-Toiyabe National Forest
 Buffalo, New York:
 Humboldt Park, now Martin Luther King, Jr. Park 
 Humboldt Parkway, repurposed  
 Humboldt Park (Chicago park) 
 Parque Nacional Alejandro de Humboldt in Cuba
 Monumento Nacional Alejandro de Humboldt, at Cueva del Guácharo National Park in Venezuela
 Sima Humboldt, sinkhole in Venezuela

Water and ice features 

 Oceanic:
 Humboldt Glacier in Greenland
 Pacific Basin:
 Bays:
 Humboldt Bay, California
 Humboldt Bay, AKA Yos Sudarso Bay, New Guinea 
 Humboldt Current or Peru Current of the Pacific
 On land:
 Humboldt Falls, Fiordland, New Zealand
 Humboldt River basin, Nevada, United States:
 Humboldt River
 Little Humboldt River
 Humboldt Salt Marsh
 Humboldt Sink
 Lake Humboldt

Organizations and institutions
 Latin America:
 German schools: 
 In Mexico:
 Colegio Alemán Alexander von Humboldt, Mexico City
 Colegio Humboldt, Puebla, Mexico
 Colégio Humboldt, São Paulo, Brazil
 Colegio Humboldt, Caracas, Venezuela
 Humboldt Shipmanagement, Valparaíso, Chile
 Universidad Alejandro de Humboldt, Venezuela
 Colegio Alemán Alexander von Humboldt, Lima, Peru
 Germany:
 Alexander von Humboldt Foundation, a German foundation for the promotion of international research cooperation
 Humboldtschule, Bad Homburg, a German Gymnasium in Bad Homburg vor der Höhe, Hesse
 Humboldt Box, a museum and information center in Berlin, Germany
 For 60 years (1949-2009), Humboldt Museum was a popular name referring to the Berlin's Natural History Museum, in Germany
 Humboldt University of Berlin (Humboldt-Universität zu Berlin)
 Maschinenbau Anstalt Humboldt, mechanical engineering firm in Cologne-Kalk 1871–1930
 Canada
 Humboldt Broncos, an ice hockey team from Humboldt, Saskatchewan
 US:
 Humboldt State University, California

 Humboldt High School (disambiguation), several high schools in the United States
Alexander von Humboldt German International School Montreal, Canada

Biological groups

Animals
 Vesper bat (Humboldt's big-eared brown bat) (Histiotus humboldti)
 Woolly monkey (Humboldt's woolly monkey) (Lagothrix lagotricha)
 Squirrel monkey (Humboldt's squirrel monkey) (Saimiri sciureus cassiquiarensis)
 Humboldt penguin (Spheniscus humboldti)
 Humboldt's hog-nosed skunk (Conepatus humboldtii)
 Golden-backed uakari (Cacajao melanocephalus)
 Humboldt squid (Dosidicus gigas)
 Amazon river dolphin subspecies (Inia geoffrensis humboldtiana)

Plants
 Anthurium humboldtianum, a species of arum
 Utricularia humboldtii, a large perennial carnivorous plant
 Mammillaria humboldtii, a cactus species
 Lilium humboldtii, Humboldt's lily
 Russula humboldtii, a mushroom species
 Quercus humboldtii, a South American oak
 Myrmecophila humboldtii, an orchid species

Ships
 Alexander von Humboldt (ship), a German tall ship
 USS Humboldt (AVP-21), a United States Navy seaplane tender in commission from 1941 to 1947
 USCGC Humboldt (WAVP-372), later WHEC-372, a United States Coast Guard cutter in commission from 1949 to 1969
 Humboldt (steamer), an 1896 wooden steamer on the Alaska route, that also sailed between Los Angeles and San Francisco

In space 
 4877 Humboldt, asteroid
 54 Alexandra, asteroid
 Humboldt (crater) on the Moon
 Mare Humboldtianum, lunar mare (sea)

Venezuela 
 El Ávila National Park (Hotel Humboldt), a hotel in Caracas
 Sima Humboldt, a sinkhole in Venezuela
 Pico Humboldt in Venezuela
 Monumento Nacional Alejandro de Humboldt, at Cueva del Guácharo National Park in Venezuela

Other uses 
 Humboldt Airport, Saskatchewan, Canada
 Humboldt Broncos bus crash, which occurred near Humboldt, Saskatchewan
 Humboldt Prize, for research

See also 
 Humboldt Municipal Airport (disambiguation)